Something may refer to:

Philosophy and language 
Something (concept)
Something, an English indefinite pronoun

Music

Albums
Something (Chairlift album), 2012
Something (Shirley Bassey album), 1970
Something (Shirley Scott album), 1970

Songs
"Something" (Andrius Pojavis song), 2012
"Something" (Beatles song), 1969
"Something" (TVXQ song), 2014
"Something" (Lasgo song), 2001
"Something", by Aerosmith from Music from Another Dimension!, 2012
"Something", by Dark Lotus from Tales from the Lotus Pod, 2001
"Something", by Escape the Fate from This War Is Ours, 2008
"Something", by Girl's Day from Girl's Day Everyday #3, 2014
"Something", by Gnash, 2016
"Something", by Guy Sebastian from Conscious, 2017
"Something", by the Move, the B-side of the single "Blackberry Way", 1968
"Something", by Shakira from Oral Fixation, Vol. 2, 2005
"Something", by White Noise Owl from Condition Critical, 2019

See also
"Sumthin", a song by Devo from Something for Everybody
Some Things, an album by Lasgo
Anything (disambiguation)
Everything (disambiguation)
Nothing (disambiguation)
Thing (disambiguation)